Romania competed at the 1984 Summer Olympics in Los Angeles, United States. 124 competitors, 71 men and 53 women, took part in 86 events in 13 sports. Notably, Romania was the only Eastern Bloc nation to participate at these Games; all others followed the Soviet Union's boycott of the Games.  The Romanian athletes were greeted with warm applause as they entered the Los Angeles Memorial Coliseum during the opening ceremony, in part an affirmation of the nation's defiance of the boycott. The Romanian Olympic team was phenomenally successful at the games, ultimately placing second to the United States in the gold medal tally.

Medalists

Athletics

Women's 1,500 metres 
 Doina Melinte 
 Heat — 4:10.48
 Final — 4:03.76 (→  Silver Medal)

 Maricica Puică 
 Heat — 4:05.30
 Final — 4:04.15 (→  Bronze Medal)

 Fița Lovin 
 Heat — 4:10.58
 Final — 4:09.11 (→ 9th place)

Women's 3,000 metres 
 Maricica Puică 
 Heat — 8:43.32
 Final — 8:35.96 (→  Gold Medal)

Women's 400m Hurdles 
 Cristieana Cojocaru 
 Heat — 56.94 
 Semifinal — 55.24
 Final — 55.41 (→  Bronze Medal)

Women's High Jump
Niculina Vasile
 Qualification — 1.90m
 Final — 1.85m (→ 11th place)

Women's Long Jump
Anișoara Cușmir-Stanciu
 Qualification — 6.69 m
 Final — 6.96 m (→  Gold Medal)

Valy Ionescu
 Qualification — 6.60 m
 Final — 6.81 m (→  Silver Medal)

Women's Discus Throw 
 Florența Crăciunescu 
 Qualification — 57.84m
 Final — 63.64m (→  Bronze Medal)

Women's Shot Put
 Mihaela Loghin
 Final — 20.47 m (→  Silver Medal)

 Florența Crăciunescu 
 Final — 17.23 m (→ 8th place)

Boxing

Men's Featherweight (– 57 kg)
Nicolae Talpos
 First Round — Bye
 Second Round — Lost to Meldrick Taylor (United States), 0:5

Men's Lightweight (– 60 kg)
Viorel Ioana
 First Round — Lost to Renato Cornett (Australia), 1:4

Men's Light Welterweight (– 63.5 kg)
Mircea Fulger →  Bronze Medal
 First Round — Bye
 Second Round — Defeated Jean Duarte (France), RSC-1
 Third Round — Defeated Stefan Sjøstrand (SWE), 5:0
 Quarterfinals — Defeated Lofti Belkhir (Tunisia), 5:0
 Semifinals — Lost to Dhawee Umponmaha (Thailand), 0:5

Men's Welterweight (– 67 kg)
Rudel Obreja
 First Round — Defeated Antoine Loungoude (RCA), KO-1
 Second Round — Defeated Michael Hughes (GBR), 5:0
 Third Round — Lost to Mark Breland (United States), 0:5

Men's Light Middleweight (– 71 kg)
Gheorghe Simion
 First Round — Lost to Ahn Dal-Ho (South Korea), 0:5

Men's Light Heavyweight (– 81 kg)
Georgica Donici
 First Round — Bye
 Second Round — Defeated Fine Sani (Tonga), 5:0
 Quarterfinals — Lost to Anton Josipović (Yugoslavia), 0:5

Canoeing

Fencing

Eleven fencers, six men and five women, represented Romania in 1984.

Men's foil
 Petru Kuki

Men's sabre
 Marin Mustață
 Ioan Pop
 Cornel Marin

Men's team sabre
 Marin Mustață, Ioan Pop, Alexandru Chiculiță, Cornel Marin, Vilmoș Szabo

Women's foil
 Elisabeta Guzganu-Tufan
 Aurora Dan
 Marcela Moldovan-Zsak

Women's team foil
 Aurora Dan, Monika Weber-Koszto, Rozalia Oros, Marcela Moldovan-Zsak, Elisabeta Guzganu-Tufan

Gymnastics

Handball

Men's Team Competition
Preliminary Round (Group A)
Defeated Algeria (25-16) 
Defeated Iceland (26-17) 
Defeated Switzerland (23-17) 
Defeated Japan (28-22) 
Lost to Yugoslavia (18-19) 
Bronze Medal Match
Defeated Denmark (23-19) →  Bronze Medal

Team Roster
Mircea Bedivan
Dumitru Berbece
Iosif Boroș
Alexandru Buligan
Gheorghe Covaciu
Gheorghe Dogărescu
Marian Dumitru
Cornel Durău
Alexandru Fölker
Nicolae Munteanu
Vasile Oprea
Adrian Simion
Vasile Stîngă
Neculai Vasilcă
Maricel Voinea

Judo

Rhythmic gymnastics

Rowing

Men

Women

Shooting

Men

Women

Swimming

Women's 100m Backstroke
Carmen Bunaciu
 Heat — 1:03.79
 Final — 1:03.21 (→ 4th place)

Anca Pătrășcoiu
 Heat — 1:04.16
 Final — 1:03.29 (→ 5th place)

Women's 200m Backstroke
Anca Pătrășcoiu
 Heat — 2:16.71
 Final — 2:13.29 (→  Bronze Medal)

Carmen Bunaciu
 Heat — 2:16.41
 Final — 2:16.15 (→ 7th place)

Women's 400m Individual Medley
Anca Pătrășcoiu
 Heat — 5:03.97
 B-Final — 5:05.53 (→ 16th place)

Water polo

Weightlifting

Wrestling

References

Nations at the 1984 Summer Olympics
1984
1984 in Romanian sport